Ernie Fischer (July 12, 1930 – April 20, 2019) was an American wrestler. He competed in the men's freestyle welterweight at the 1956 Summer Olympics.

References

1930 births
2019 deaths
American male sport wrestlers
Olympic wrestlers of the United States
Wrestlers at the 1956 Summer Olympics
Sportspeople from Baltimore